BC Nizhny Novgorod, commonly known as simply Nizhny Novgorod, also known as Pari Nizhny Novgorod for sponsorship reasons, is a Russian professional basketball club from the city of Nizhny Novgorod, Russia. The team participates in the VTB United League and FIBA Europe Cup.

History
Basketball club Nizhny Novgorod is the only professional men's basketball team in Nizhny Novgorod and the region.
It was founded in 2000. It played in the Russian Third Division. Alexander Khairetdinov became the general director, main coach and doctor. In the 2001–02 season the club was named Nizhegorodsky Basketball Academy, or NBA. Since then it had changed several names: NBA (2001–2002), NBA-Seti-NN (2002–2004), NBA-Telma (2004–2006). After the 2005–06 season the team entered the Superleague B and was called NBA-Nizhny Novgorod.

Two seasons in the Superleague B were successful for NBA-NN, with the 5th and the 6th places. In 2008–09 the team finished only the 7th. In October 2008 there were changes in the management. The new Minister for Investment Policies of Nizhny Novgorod region, Olympic champion Dmitri Svatkovskiy became the President of the club. Sergei Panov – the twelve times champion of Russia, Euroleague champion, silver medallist of the World and European championships – became the general manager. Serbian coach Zoran Lukic was appointed head coach.

Before the season 2009–10 the management worked on the players selection ending with the entire changes to the team roster. Ex-member of the youth CSKA team Dmitry Kulagin was offered a contract. Beside this the club changed its name to BC Nizhny Novgorod (BCNN). By the end of the 2010 season the team took the first place in the Superleague B which respectively granted them the right to play in the elite division of the Russian basketball.

During the 2010–11 season BCNN was among those clubs who had founded the new Russian Professional Basketball League.
Also the team played in the EuroChallenge in 2010–11, not having much success though getting new international cup experience.
In the Cup of Russia 2010–11 season, for the first time in its history BCNN took part in the Final of the Four winning silver medals.

During its first year in the Russian basketball elite division, Nizhny Novgorod took the final fifth place in the Russian championship while Head coach Zoran Lukic became The Coach of the Year in BEKO Professional basketball league. In the 2011–12 season the team failed to enter the play-off of the Russian championship, finishing the season at #9.

In the 2013–14 season Nizhny Novgorod reached the Finals of the VTB United League, in which it lost 0–3 to CSKA Moscow. Therefore, the team qualified for the 2014–15 EuroLeague regular season. The team, led by Rochestie and Parakhouski, reached the Top 16 over the likes of UNICS and Sassari. In 2015, Israeli NBA player Gal Mekel played for the team.

Honours
Total titles: 2

Domestic competition
VTB United League
Runners-up (1): 2013–14
Russian Cup
Winner (1): 2023
Runner-up (3): 2011, 2018, 2019
Russian Basketball Super League 1
Winner (1): 2010

European competition
EuroCup
Semi-finalist (1): 2013–14

Other competitions
Nesterov Cup
Winner (1): 2014
Godella, Spain Invitational Game
Winner (1): 2014

Logos
Before the start of the 2016–17 season, Nizhny Novgorod changed its primary logo.

Season by season

Roster

References

External links

 Official site 
 The history of the club 
 Eurobasket.com Team Info

Basketball teams in Russia
Sport in Nizhny Novgorod
Basketball teams established in 2000
2000 establishments in Russia